The United States Senate Committee on Finance (or, less formally, Senate Finance Committee) is a standing committee of the United States Senate. The Committee concerns itself with matters relating to taxation and other revenue measures generally, and those relating to the insular possessions; bonded debt of the United States; customs, collection districts, and ports of entry and delivery; deposit of public moneys; general revenue sharing; health programs under the Social Security Act (notably Medicare and Medicaid) and health programs financed by a specific tax or trust fund; national social security; reciprocal trade agreements; tariff and import quotas, and related matters thereto; and the transportation of dutiable goods. It is considered to be one of the most powerful committees in Congress.

History

The Committee on Finance is one of the original committees established in the Senate. First created on December 11, 1815, as a select committee and known as the Committee on Finance and an [sic] Uniform National Currency, it was formed to alleviate economic issues arising from the War of 1812. On December 10, 1816 the Senate officially created the Committee on Finance as a standing committee.  Originally, the Committee had power over tariffs, taxation, banking and currency issues and appropriations.  Under this authority the committee played an influential role in the most heated topics of the era; including numerous tariffs issues and the Bank War. The committee was also influential in the creation of the Department of Interior in 1849.  Under the Chairmanship of William Pitt Fessenden, the committee played a decisive role during the Civil War.  Appropriating all funds for the war effort as well as raising enough funds to finance the war through tariffs and the nation's first income tax.  Additionally, the committee produced the Legal Tender Act of 1862, the nation's first reliance on paper currency.

In 1865 the House of Representatives created an Appropriations Committee to relieve the burden from the Committee on Ways and Means.  The Senate followed this example by forming the Senate Appropriations Committee in 1867.

Despite the loss of one of its signature duties the committee continued to play a prominent role in the major issues of the nation.  The committee was at the center of the debate over the silver question in the latter half of the 19th Century.  Passage of the Bland–Allison Act and the Sherman Silver Purchase Act were attempts to remedy the demand for silver, though the silver cause would eventually fail by the end of the century.  The committee also continued to play a role in the debate over income taxes.  The repeal of the Civil War income taxes in the 1870s would eventually be raised in 1894 with the passage of a new income tax law.  The Supreme Court's decision in  ruled the income tax as unconstitutional, since it was not based on apportionment.  The fight for an income tax finally culminated with the Payne–Aldrich Tariff Act of 1909.  In order to pass the new tariff Senate leaders, including Chairman Nelson Aldrich, allowed for a Constitutional Amendment to be passed.  Four years later the 16th Amendment was officially ratified and in 1913 the nation's first peacetime income tax was instituted.

Around that same time the committee lost jurisdiction over banking and currency issues to the newly created Committee on Banking and Currency.  The committee did gain jurisdiction over veterans’ benefits when it successfully passed the War Risk Insurance Act of 1917.  The act shifted pensions from gratuities to benefits and which served as one of the first life insurance programs created under the federal government.

The Finance Committee continued to play an increasingly important role in the lives of the nation's veterans.  The committee helped to consolidate the veteran bureaucracy by streamlining the various responsibilities into a Veterans' Bureau, which ultimately would become the Veterans' Administration.  In 1924 the committee passed a "Bonus Bill" that compensated World War I veterans for their service.  This series of improved veteran benefits reached a crescendo in 1944 with the passage of the Servicemen's Readjustment Act.  Senator Bennett "Champ" Clark, who served as the Chairman of the Subcommittee on Veterans, assured smooth sailing of the bill through the Senate.  The bill not only ended the usual demands from returning veterans that had been seen in nearly every war the US had participated in, but also provided more generous benefits than veterans had previously received, including funds for continuing education, loans and unemployment insurance.

Not all Finance Committee legislation was as well received as the G.I. Bill.  At the beginning of the Great Depression the committee passed the Smoot–Hawley Tariff Act.  The act greatly increased tariffs and had a negative effect on the nation's economy.  Following traditional economic practices the members of the committee, including Chairman Reed Smoot, felt that protection of American businesses was required in order to buoy them during the dire economic times.  The effort backfired and the economic situation worsened.  The Smoot-Hawley Tariff would eventually be replaced by the Reciprocal Tariff Act of 1934 which authorized the President to negotiate trade agreements.  This act not only set up the trade policy system as it exists today but also effectively transferred trade making policy from the Congress to the President.

The committee also played an important role in two major acts created under the New Deal.  The committee received jurisdiction over the National Industrial Recovery Act because of tax code changes in the bill.  The new bureaucracy was President Franklin D. Roosevelt's attempt to stimulate the economy and promote jobs for unemployed Americans while also regulating businesses.  The National Recovery Administration would ultimately fail as it lost public support, but the act served as a springboard for the Wagner Act and the National Labor Board.

Probably the largest and most lasting pieces of legislation shaped by the Finance Committee during the New Deal was the 1935 Social Security Act.  Once again, the committee received jurisdiction owing to the payroll taxes that would be enacted to pay for the new program.  The act was the first effort by the federal government to provide benefits to the elderly and the unemployed, leading to enhanced economic welfare for many elderly Americans.

In 1981, a Senate Resolution required the printing of the History of the Committee on Finance.

Role
The role of the Committee on Finance is very similar to that of the House Committee on Ways and Means.  The one exception in area of jurisdiction is that the Committee on Finance has jurisdiction over both Medicare and Medicaid,  while the House Ways and Means Committee only has jurisdiction over Medicare. (The House Energy and Commerce Committee has jurisdiction over Medicaid.) The other difference in terms of power is that all revenue raising measures must originate in the House giving the Ways and Means Committee a slight edge in setting tax policy.

In addition to having jurisdiction over legislation, the Committee on Finance has extensive oversight powers.  It has authority to investigate, review and evaluate existing laws, and the agencies that implement them.

Jurisdiction
In accordance of Rule XXV of the United States Senate, all proposed legislation, messages, petitions, memorials, and other matters relating to the following subjects is referred to the Senate Committee on Finance:
 Bonded debt of the United States, except as provided in the Congressional Budget Act of 1974;
 Customs, collection districts, and ports of entry and delivery;
 Deposit of public moneys;
 General revenue sharing;
 Health programs under the Social Security Act and health programs financed by a specific tax or trust fund;
 National social security;
 Reciprocal trade agreements;
 Revenue measures generally, except as provided in the Congressional Budget Act of 1974;
 Revenue measures relating to the insular possessions;
 Tariffs and import quotas, and matters related thereto; and,
 Transportation of dutiable goods.

Given its broad remit with regards to taxation, mandatory spending, international trade, Social Security, Temporary Assistance to Needy Families, interest on the national debt, and healthcare finance - including Medicare, Medicaid, and the Children's Health Insurance Program - the Senate Committee on Finance is arguably one of the most influential standing committees in either house of Congress. A wide array of senators with differing policy interests seek membership on the Committee due to its broad role in setting fiscal, tax, trade, health, and social policy.

Members, 118th Congress

Chairs

Historical committee rosters

117th Congress

Subcommittees

116th Congress

Subcommittees

Source

115th Congress

References

External links
  (Archive)
 Senate Finance Committee. Legislation activity and reports, Congress.gov.
History of the Committee on Finance; United States Senate (pdf). 4th ed. Washington, D.C.: Government Printing Office, 1981.

Finance
Economy of the United States
1815 establishments in the United States
Organizations established in 1815